In geometry, the lemniscate of Bernoulli is a plane curve defined from two given points  and , known as foci, at distance  from each other as the locus of points  so that . The curve has a shape similar to the numeral 8 and to the ∞ symbol. It is a special case of the Cassini oval and is a rational algebraic curve of degree 4.

This lemniscate was first described in 1694 by Jakob Bernoulli as a modification of an ellipse, which is the locus of points for which the sum of the distances to each of two fixed focal points is a constant. A Cassini oval, by contrast, is the locus of points for which the product of these distances is constant.  In the case where the curve passes through the point midway between the foci, the oval is a lemniscate of Bernoulli.

This curve can be obtained as the inverse transform of a hyperbola, with the inversion circle centered at the center of the hyperbola (bisector of its two foci). It may also be drawn by a mechanical linkage in the form of Watt's linkage, with the lengths of the three bars of the linkage and the distance between its endpoints chosen to form a crossed parallelogram.

Equations 
The equations can be stated in terms of the focal distance  or the half-width  of a lemniscate.
 Its Cartesian equation is (up to translation and rotation):

 As a parametric equation:

 A rational parametrization:

 In polar coordinates:

 Its equation in the complex plane is:

In two-center bipolar coordinates:

In rational polar coordinates:

Arc length and elliptic functions

The determination of the arc length of arcs of the lemniscate leads to elliptic integrals, as was discovered in the eighteenth century. Around 1800, the elliptic functions inverting those integrals were studied by C. F. Gauss (largely unpublished at the time, but allusions in the notes to his Disquisitiones Arithmeticae). The period lattices are of a very special form, being proportional to the Gaussian integers.

Using the elliptic integral

the formula of the arc length  can be given as

Angles
Thales' theorem and its converse).

The following theorem about angles occurring in the lemniscate is due to German mathematician Gerhard Christoph Hermann Vechtmann, who described it 1843 in his dissertation on lemniscates. 

Further properties

The lemniscate is symmetric to the midpoint of the line segment .
The lemniscate is the circle inversion of a hyperbola and vice versa.
The planar cross-section of a standard torus tangent to its inner equator is a lemniscate.

Applications
Dynamics on this curve and its more generalized versions are studied in quasi-one-dimensional models.

See also 
Lemniscate of Booth
Lemniscate of Gerono
Gauss's constant
Lemniscatic elliptic function
Cassini oval

Notes

References

External links 

 
 "Lemniscate of Bernoulli" at The MacTutor History of Mathematics archive
 "Lemniscate of Bernoulli" at MathCurve.
 Coup d'œil sur la lemniscate de Bernoulli (in French)

Plane curves
Algebraic curves
Spiric sections